Plátano Macho was a hip-hop, rap and funk band in Uruguay. The band formed in the mid 1990s and was produced by Gabriel Casacuberta (Clecter) and Andres Perez Miranda (Androoval). The band consisted of SPD Gonzalez, Choniuk, LSPiano aka. 'Supervielle', A/PM aka Androoval and Clecter.

Their 1998 album 'The Perro Convention' with the Argentinean label PolyGram included the single, "Pendeja", which was included in the regular programming of radio Rock & Pop, MTV latino channel and also on MTV Lingo compilation, where they included bands like Cyprus Hill, Molotov and Control Machete.

Among its members were LSPiano and Clecter, current participants of the collective Bajofondo Tango Club and Androoval, current music producer Androoval Trio, Family Doctors and DubAlkolikz.

Discography

The Perro Convention (1998) 
Track list:
 Pinorton 
 That Is A Way 
 Inspector Clouseau Theme (I - Life In Hell) 
 Maestro Ninja 
 Pendeja 
 No Tiren 
 Roberto 
 T-Musculo 
 Monarca 
 La Granja 
 XQ'Tan Pesado 
 Pull Me On 
 Dr  Pa Dig 
 Chimp Onassid 
 Inspector Clousseau Theme (II - Life In Heaven) 
 Poligarcha 
 Phreacs '69 
 Come Now 
 Funky Cousins

References 

Uruguayan musical groups